The 2017–18 Greek Handball Premier is the 39th season of the Greek Handball Premier, Greece's premier handball league. Olympiacos were crowned champions, after beating AEK Athens with 3–2 wins in the finals, overturning an initial 0–2 win lead by AEK and taking three straight wins to secure the title.

Teams

A total of 12 teams will participate in this year's edition of the Handball Premier. Of these, 10 sides qualified directly from the 2016–17 season and the play-off winners from each of the two groups of A2 Ethniki were promoted: GAS Kamatero from Group A (for the first time in their history) and XANTH from Group B.

Regular season

League table

Results

Semi-finals qualifiers
In the semifinals qualifiers, the teams that finished in places 3 to 6 of the regular season play against each other (the 3rd team of the regular season faces the 6th, while the 4th team faces the 5th) and have to win two games to win the series. Thus, if one team wins two games before all three games have been played, the remaining game is omitted. The team that finished in the higher regular season place, plays the first and the third (if necessary) game of the series at home. The two winners proceed to the championship semi-finals.

Semi-finals
In the championship semi-finals, the top two teams of the regular season plus the two teams that qualified from the semifinal qualifiers play against each other and have to win two games to win the series. Thus, if one team wins two games before all three games have been played, the remaining game is omitted. The teams that directly qualified to the semifinals from the regular season play the first and the third (if necessary) game of the series at home. The two winners proceed to the championship finals.

3rd place play-offs

Finals 
In the finals, teams playing against each other have to win three games to win the series. Thus, if one team wins three games before all five games have been played, the remaining games are omitted. The team that finished in the higher championship play-off place, is going to play the first, third and fifth (if necessary) game of the series at home.

References

External links
Official website 

Handball in Greece
2017–18 domestic handball leagues
2017 in Greek sport
2018 in Greek sport